Whiteway's Peardrax is a pear-flavoured fizzy soft drink popular in Trinidad and Tobago. It originated in the United Kingdom, and was first manufactured by Whiteway's, a now-defunct cider company founded in Whimple, Devon during the 19th century.   it is bottled and distributed only by Pepsi-Cola Trinidad Bottling Company, under license since 2004 from Gaymer Cider Company.

It was especially popular among some British children during the 1960s and 1970s, though not by all: Victor Lewis-Smith recalls it as "a foul, resinous, cloying, sweet beverage" without even the "saving grace" of inducing drunkenness.  It vanished from UK shelves in 1988, together with the apple based Cydrax, suffering from plummeting sales.

Sales of the beverage continued in Trinidad and Tobago to the point that "Trinidadians and Tobagonians now see the drink as a defining part of the culture of their twin-island republic." In December 2017 both Peardrax and Cydrax brands were bought up by Caribbean Distribution Partners, joint venture of Trinidad-based Agostini’s Ltd  and Barbados-based Goddard Enterprises.

Nutritional facts per 250ml
Calories: 140
Fat: 0g
Carbohydrate: 32g
Sugars: 32g
Protein: 0g

References

Carbonated drinks
Pear sodas
Trinidad and Tobago culture